Events from the year 1327 in Ireland.

Incumbent
Lord: Edward II (until 25 January), then Edward III

Births

Deaths
 Murchadh Ó Madadhan, King of Síol Anmchadha